It's Murder! is a 1977 feature-length movie shot on Super 8 film directed by Sam Raimi while he was still in college. It was co-written and produced by Raimi and Scott Spiegel, and stars both Raimi and Spiegel. Raimi's first directorial work, it co-stars his frequent collaborator Bruce Campbell.

Plot 
The film tells the story of a family whose uncle is murdered. The son (Sam Raimi) gets everything because he is in the will. A detective (Scott Spiegel) is trying to find out who murdered the uncle while avoiding ending up dead as well.

Cast

 Scott Spiegel
 Sam Raimi
 Cheryl Guttridge
 Richard Smith
 Matt Taylor
 Bill Aaron
 Ted Raimi
 Bruce Campbell
 Ivan M. Raimi
 William E. Kirk
 Robert Tapert
 Tim Quill
 Jon Page
 Josh Becker
 Bill Ward
 Paul Krispin
 Clay Warnock
 Mike Ditz

Production
Raimi, Spiegel, Campbell and company all started making films in high school and made It's Murder! while they were still in college, working with Raimi's brother's roommate, Robert Tapert. It was shot on Super 8 film with a budget of $2,000.

References

External links
 It's Murder! at IMDb
 It's Murder! at BookOfTheDead.ws

1977 films
1970s English-language films
Films directed by Sam Raimi
1977 crime films
Films with screenplays by Sam Raimi
American student films